Royal Lethington (Pat) Maitland  (January 9, 1889 – March 28, 1946) was a Canadian lawyer and politician. He served as Deputy Premier  and the Attorney General of British Columbia in the coalition government of Premier John Hart.  He also served as national president of the Canadian Bar Association.

First term in the British Columbia Legislature
Maitland was first elected to the British Columbia Legislature as the Conservative MLA for Vancouver City in the 1928 general election. By the time of the 1933 provincial election, the Conservative government of Premier Simon Fraser Tolmie had collapsed into rival factions. Maitland did not stand for re-election.

Return to the Legislature as Leader of the Official Opposition
Maitland returned to office in the 1937 general election from the riding of Vancouver-Point Grey.  The next year, upon the death of Frank Porter Patterson, the leader of the Conservative Party,  Maitland became party leader and Leader of the Opposition.  His challenge was to rebuild the moribund British Columbia Conservative Party, which had split into two and collapsed in 1933 under Tolmie's leadership.

Joins Coalition Government of John Hart
In the 1941 provincial election, Maitland led the Conservatives to a strong finish with 30.91 per cent of the vote and 12 seats, though with the CCF doubling its seats the party was consigned to third place. The Liberal government of Thomas Dufferin Pattullo was reduced to a minority government and though it won the greatest number of seats actually received fewer votes than the CCF. The Liberal Party pressured Pattullo to form a coalition government with the Conservatives in order to forestall the government's collapse and a possible CCF victory.

Pattullo refused and was replaced as Liberal leader and Premier by John Hart who was willing to form a coalition. Maitland's Conservatives joined the government, obtaining three seats in Cabinet to the Liberals' five.  Maitland became Deputy Premier and Attorney General.

Four years later, in the 1945 provincial election, Maitland's Conservatives contested the election jointly with the Liberals and were re-elected.

Legal career
Maitland was a prominent criminal lawyer and law professor, and was active in the Canadian Bar Association. He spent part of his career (1915 to 1919) as a city prosecutor in Vancouver. He served as President of the Association in 1943–1944, while he was Attorney General.

Death
Maitland died from influenza at Vancouver General Hospital on March 28, 1946, the year after his successful participation in the 1945 general election.

References

1889 births
1946 deaths
British Columbia Conservative Party politicians
British Columbia Conservative Party MLAs
Attorneys General of British Columbia
British Columbia Conservative Party leaders
20th-century Canadian lawyers
Lawyers in British Columbia
Canadian Bar Association Presidents